

Fritz-Rudolf Schultz (19 February 1917 – 2 March 2002) was a German politician and member of the FDP. During World War II, Schultz served in the Wehrmacht as an officer and regimental commander. He was awarded the Knight's Cross of the Iron Cross with Oak Leaves. 

After the war Schultz initially worked on his parents vineyard in Gau-Bischofsheim. He became a member of the German Bundestag and was elected Ombudsman for the Military on 11 March 1970. He held this office until 19 March 1975.

Awards
 Iron Cross (1939) 2nd Class (29 September 1939) & 1st Class (1 September 1940)

 German Cross in Gold on 26 December 1943 as Hauptmann in the I./Panzer-Regiment 35
 Knight's Cross of the Iron Cross with Oak Leaves
 Knight's Cross on 21 April 1944 as Hauptmann of the Reserve and commander of the I./Panzer-Regiment 35
 Oak Leaves on 28 October 1944 as Major and leader of Panzer-Regiment 35

References

Citations

Bibliography

External links

1917 births
2002 deaths
Military Ombudspersons in Germany
Recipients of the Gold German Cross
Recipients of the Knight's Cross of the Iron Cross with Oak Leaves
Commanders Crosses of the Order of Merit of the Federal Republic of Germany
Free Democratic Party (Germany) politicians
Members of the Bundestag for Rhineland-Palatinate
Members of the Landtag of Rhineland-Palatinate
Members of the Bundestag for the Social Democratic Party of Germany
German Army officers of World War II
Military personnel from Munich
Panzer commanders